The 1971–72 Western Kentucky Hilltoppers men's basketball team represented Western Kentucky University during the 1971–72 NCAA University Division men's basketball season. The Hilltoppers were led by new coach Jim Richards and All-Ohio Valley Conference player Jerry Dunn.  WKU finished in a three-way tie for the OVC championship.  No conference tournament was held, so a playoff was scheduled to determine which team would go on to the NCAA tournament.  The Hilltoppers lost in the playoff to Morehead State.

Schedule

|-
!colspan=6| OVC Playoff

References

Western Kentucky Hilltoppers basketball seasons
Western Kentucky
Western Kentucky Basketball, Men's
Western Kentucky Basketball, Men's